Leblanc is a Zürich based Swiss car manufacturer. It makes modified high-performance automobiles in very low quantities. The company is just beginning to enter the American market.

Caroline
It has a top speed of 348 km/h and a 0–97 km/h time of 2.6 seconds.

Mirabeau
The Leblanc Mirabeau is an open street legal race car with a rear mid-engine, rear-wheel drive layout, designed to the specifications of the FIA/Le Mans standards. The Mirabeau has a top speed of 370 km/h and a price tag of $650,000.

References

External links
  

Car manufacturers of Switzerland
Swiss brands